Dexter J. Bean (born January 5, 1987) is an American professional stock car racing driver and crew chief who competed part-time in the NASCAR Xfinity Series, driving the No. 92 Chevrolet Camaro SS for DGM Racing, and also crew chiefs for the team on occasion. He has also competed part-time in both the NASCAR Cup Series and NASCAR Camping World Truck Series in the past, both in 2009. Prior to competing in those series, he ran full-time for three years (as well as part-time in a fourth) in what is now the ARCA Menards Series, where he finished third in the standings in 2007.

Racing career

Early career
Bean began his racing career at age 10 in go-karts, and switched to stock cars at the age of 16, driving for family-owned BlackJack Racing; the team was named after Bean's father, David, used his winnings from a gambling trip to Las Vegas to start the team. After competing in late model competition at LaCrosse Fairgrounds Speedway, Bean moved to regional touring competition in the Wisconsin Challenge Series and the NASCAR AutoZone Elite Series Midwest Division.

2005–2008: ARCA and Busch Series
Bean made his debut in what was then the ARCA Re/Max Series in the season-opener at Daytona in 2005, driving for Andy Hillenburg in his No. 10 Fast Track Racing Enterprises Pontiac. Later in the year, his family would start their own team, BlackJack Racing, and Bean competed for them between 2005 and 2007. Bean posted a best points finish of third at the end of the 2007 season. Bean also tested a Craftsman Truck Series truck for Germain Racing in 2007, but never made any starts.

Having run a single Busch Series race for Spraker Racing Enterprises in 2006, Bean rejoined Spraker's team for the 2008 ARCA season, driving the No. 37 Glock Chevrolet. However, he dropped to 11th in points that year.

2009: NASCAR Cup and Truck Series
For the 2009 season, Bean moved to the Sprint Cup Series with his family-owned team, attempting to run for the series' Rookie of the Year award. After failing to qualify for races at Las Vegas Motor Speedway and Phoenix International Raceway, Bean qualified the No. 51 Dodge for the Pocono 500 at Pocono Raceway, starting 41st and finishing 36th, four laps behind race winner Tony Stewart. Bean failed to qualify for races at New Hampshire Motor Speedway and Chicagoland Speedway later in the year. Bean also ran three Craftsman Truck Series races in 2009, driving trucks for Mario Gosselin in events at Dover International Speedway and The Milwaukee Mile, and for Tagsby Racing at Gateway International Raceway, posting a best finish of 17th at Milwaukee.

2015–present: Second stint in NASCAR

After being without a ride in any NASCAR series for five years (2010 through 2014), Bean returned to the sport in 2015, driving the No. 92 for Mario Gosselin's team in what became the Xfinity Series at the season-opening race at Daytona. Martin Roy was originally supposed to drive that car that weekend, but was injured in a skiing accident over the offseason, so Gosselin called up Bean, the husband of his wife's sister, to drive his second car. Bean had previously driven for Gosselin's team part-time in 2009 in the Truck Series when they fielded an entry, the No. 12 truck, in that series. He made his second attempt of the season at Las Vegas Motor Speedway, but failed to qualify. However, Bean was called to replace Joey Gase in the No. 52 Jimmy Means Racing Chevy after Gase suffered food poisoning prior to the race; Gase started the race, and Bean took over during the event.

In 2019, Bean announced his return to Xfinity competition at Road America. driving the DGM Racing No. 90 Chevrolet.

Personal life
Bean was born in Westby, Wisconsin on January 5, 1987. He has type 1 diabetes. Bean is married to former Ms. North Carolina, Misty McCrary. Together they have two daughters, Marley Mae, born in November 2013, and Moxley Drew, born in November 2015. Bean is also the brother-in-law of Mario Gosselin, who he has driven for part-time in both the Truck (2009) and Xfinity Series (since 2015).

Motorsports career results

NASCAR
(key) (Bold – Pole position awarded by qualifying time. Italics – Pole position earned by points standings or practice time. * – Most laps led.)

Sprint Cup Series

Xfinity Series

 Season still in progress
 Ineligible for series points

Camping World Truck Series

ARCA Re/Max Series
(key) (Bold – Pole position awarded by qualifying time. Italics – Pole position earned by points standings or practice time. * – Most laps led.)

References

External links

  Broken link
 
 

Living people
1987 births
People from Westby, Wisconsin
Racing drivers from Wisconsin
NASCAR drivers
ARCA Menards Series drivers
People with type 1 diabetes